Tetramorium parasiticum is a species of ant in the genus Tetramorium. It is endemic to South Africa.

References

parasiticum
Endemic insects of South Africa
Hymenoptera of Africa
Insects described in 1980
Vulnerable animals
Vulnerable biota of Africa
Taxonomy articles created by Polbot